Page protection may refer to:

 In computer architecture, memory protection with page granularity
 NX bit, no-execute page protection
 On Wikipedia, the protection policy, about the protection of articles so they can only be edited by established editors